Raymond Ellis Jennison (January 19, 1910 – May 13, 1990) was an American football tackle in the National Football League (NFL) for the Green Bay Packers during the 1931 NFL season.

References

1910 births
1990 deaths
American football offensive linemen
South Dakota State Jackrabbits football players
Green Bay Packers players
Players of American football from South Dakota
People from Sanborn County, South Dakota